Jefferson Township, Arkansas may refer to:

 Jefferson Township, Boone County, Arkansas
 Jefferson Township, Calhoun County, Arkansas
 Jefferson Township, Desha County, Arkansas
 Jefferson Township, Independence County, Arkansas
 Jefferson Township, Izard County, Arkansas
 Jefferson Township, Jackson County, Arkansas
 Jefferson Township, Jefferson County, Arkansas
 Jefferson Township, Little River County, Arkansas
 Jefferson Township, Marion County, Arkansas
 Jefferson Township, Newton County, Arkansas
 Jefferson Township, Ouachita County, Arkansas
 Jefferson Township, Saline County, Arkansas
 Jefferson Township, Sevier County, Arkansas
 Jefferson Township, White County, Arkansas

See also 
 List of townships in Arkansas
 Jefferson Township (disambiguation)

Arkansas township disambiguation pages